Coke is a surname. Notable people with the surname include:

Coke (footballer) (b. 1987), a Spanish footballer
Christopher Coke (b. 1969), alleged drug lord in Jamaica
David Coke (1915–1941), a British pilot during World War II
Dorothy Coke (1897-1979), a British artist
Edward Coke (1552–1634), English entrepreneur and jurist
Edward Coke (1758–1837), a British politician and landowner
Edward Coke, 7th Earl of Leicester (1936–2015), a British earl
Giles Coke, an English footballer
Jānis Čoke (1878–1910), a Latvian revolutionary and bank robber
John Coke (1563–1644), an English politician
John Talbot Coke (1841-1912), British Army Major-general and author of a Coke family history
Peter Coke (1913–2008), a British actor, playwright and artist
Phil Coke, an American major league baseball pitcher on the Tigers as of 2010-2011
Richard Coke, an American lawyer, farmer, and statesman
Richard Coke Jr., a Virginia congressman
Richard Toby Coke (born 1954), an English politician
Roger Coke a 17th-century English writer, and son of Henry Coke
Roger Sacheverell Coke (1912–1972) an English composer and pianist
Thomas Coke (bishop) (1747–1814), the first Methodist Bishop
Thomas Coke, 1st Earl of Leicester (seventh creation) (1754–1842), agricultural reformer
Van Deren Coke (1921-2004), American photographer, scholar and museum professional